David Bonnett (born August 24, 1964) is an American former professional stock car racing driver. He last raced in the NASCAR Busch Series. He is the son of the late Neil Bonnett.

Motorsports Career Results

Busch Grand National Series

References

External links
 

1964 births
NASCAR drivers
Living people
Sportspeople from Bessemer, Alabama
Racing drivers from Alabama
Alabama Gang
Dale Earnhardt Inc. drivers